The Jazz Cinderella is a 1930 American romantic drama film directed by Scott Pembroke and starring Myrna Loy, Jason Robards Sr. and Nancy Welford. In Britain it was released under the alternative title of Love Is Like That.

Cast
 Myrna Loy as Mildred Vane  
 Jason Robards Sr. as Herbert Carter  
 Nancy Welford as Patricia Murray  
 Dorothy Phillips as Mrs. Consuelo Carter 
 David Durand as Danny Murray  
 Freddie Burke Frederick as Junior Carter  
 Frank McGlynn Sr. as Henry Murray  
 James P. Burtis as Ollie  
 George Cowl as Darrow  
 Murray Smith as Epstein  
 William H. Strauss as Fineman  
 Roland Ray as Pierre  
 June Gittelson as Sylvia de Sprout

References

Bibliography
 Leider, Emily W. Myrna Loy: The Only Good Girl in Hollywood. University of California Press, 2011.

External links
 

1930 films
1930 romantic drama films
1930s English-language films
American romantic drama films
Films directed by Scott Pembroke
American black-and-white films
Chesterfield Pictures films
1930s American films